The Big Orange Splot is a children's picture book by Daniel Manus Pinkwater. It was published in 1977 by Scholastic Inc., New York. The age range is ages 4–8, and all 32 pages have a full color picture, which helps the child visualize when reading.

The vocabulary and themes in the book suggest it is targeted at adults as well.

Plot 

The main character, Mr. Plumbean, lives on a "neat street" where all the houses look the same. A seagull flies over his house and drops a can of bright orange paint on his roof, but instead of repainting his house to look like all the others on the street, Mr. Plumbean paints it to resemble his dreams. His neighbors send people to talk him into repainting his house to look like theirs, but everyone he talks to ends up painting their houses like their dreams also. In the end, all the neighbors say: "Our street is us and we are it. Our street is where we like to be, and it looks like all our dreams." The drawings were made with markers, and if one looks closely one can see the marker lines. In an interview in 1978 Daniel Manus Pinkwater revealed the hallucinogenic undertones clearly referenced throughout the story. Due to this interview the book was pulled from most libraries in Missouri in the early 1980s.

Use in education 

The book is being used in elementary school education in the US and Canada.

See also

Broken windows theory

References

External links

American picture books
1977 children's books
Children's fiction books